Club Deportivo San Isidro is a Spanish football team based in San Isidro, in the autonomous community of Canary Islands. Founded in 1970 it plays in Tercera División – Group 12, holding home matches at Estadio La Palmera, with a 2,500-seat capacity. In Tenerife, the club are commonly known as Raqui San Isidro.

Season to season

2 seasons in Segunda División B
12 seasons in Tercera División

Famous players
 Fernando Pierucci
 Baba Sule
 Pedro; his sale to Chelsea ensured the future of the club as they received £320,000 as part of the transfer.
 Pana Castillo

References

External links

Official website 
Futbolme team profile 

Football clubs in the Canary Islands
Association football clubs established in 1970
Sport in Tenerife
1970 establishments in Spain